Henri Lauener (13 July 1933 in Bern - 28 October 2002, Bern) was a Swiss philosopher interested  in both transcendental and analytic currents. He has been the editor of the journal Dialectica. A Lauener Foundation for Analytical Philosophy has been developed, which awards a biennial prize to outstanding life works in this field.

Works 
Die Sprache in der Philosophie Hegels. Mit besonderer Berücksichtigung der Ästhetik . Haupt, Bern 1962
Hume und Kant. Systematische Gegenüberstellung einiger Hauptpunkte ihrer Lehren. Francke, Bern 1969
Willard Van Orman Quine. C.H. Beck (BsR 503), München 1982, 
Offene Transzendentalphilosophie. Kovac (Boethiana 50), Hamburg 2002, 
Handlungskontext. Regelkonforme Verwendung und Bedeutung (mit Benito Müller). Academia Richarz (Academia Philosophical Studies 14), Sankt Augustin 1998,

References

External links
 Lauener Foundation website

1933 births
2002 deaths
People from Bern
Analytic philosophers
20th-century Swiss philosophers